Hiltonius pulchrus is a species of millipede in the family Spirobolidae, endemic to the United States. It occurs in California from Kern County to San Diego County.

References

Further reading

Spirobolida
Millipedes of North America
Articles created by Qbugbot
Animals described in 1918